José Abad was a Spanish-Chilean television presenter and radio host. Since 1975 until his premature death in 1980 he anchored 60 Minutos in Televisión Nacional.

References

People from Madrid
Chilean television presenters
Chilean television personalities
Spanish emigrants to Chile